Father's House is the debut album by Athens, Georgia rock band Dreams So Real.  It was released by Coyote Records in 1986, and was produced by R.E.M. guitarist Peter Buck. It was distributed by Twin/Tone Records.

Track listing
 "History"
 "Heaven"
 "Drifting Away"
 "The Tower"
 "Father's House"
 "Maybe I'll Go Today"
 "Capitol Mall"
 "Up To Fate"
 "Birds of a Feather"
 "Canadian Girl"

References

1986 albums
Dreams So Real albums
Albums produced by Peter Buck